Kirribilli is a suburb of Sydney, New South Wales, Australia. One of the city's most established and affluent neighbourhoods, it is located three kilometres north of the Sydney central business district, in the local government area administered by North Sydney Council. Kirribilli is a harbourside suburb, sitting on the Lower North Shore of Sydney Harbour. Kirribilli House is one of the two official residences of the Prime Minister of Australia.

History

The name Kirribilli is derived from an Aboriginal word Kiarabilli, which means 'good fishing spot'. Another theory suggests that Kirribilli is an adaptation of 'Carabella', the name given by early colonist James Milson to his first house.

The suburb initially formed in the vicinity of Jeffrey Street and was subsequently part of a grant to James Milson (1785-1872), after whom Milsons Point was named. The area was largely covered in native bush. As the decades passed, the land was cleared bit by bit and sub-divided, first for the construction of large family residences during the 1840s, secondly for the erection of Victorian terrace houses from the 1860s onwards, and finally for 20th-Century flats.

Prominent early landowners in Kirribilli included members of the Campbell, Jeffrey and Gibbes families. Colonel John George Nathaniel Gibbes (1787-1873), the Collector of Customs for New South Wales, built 'Wotonga' - the forerunner of Admiralty House - in 1842–43 on a  site which he leased, and then purchased, from the Campbells. Gibbes' son, William John Gibbes, lived nearby in Beulah House during the 1840s. Beulah was later lived in by the Riley and Lasseter families. Eventually, the house was demolished and its grounds subdivided into numerous residential blocks which were put up for public auction in 1905.

Although Kirribilli is a predominantly residential area today, from 1890 to 1921, the Pastoral Finance Association had a large wool warehouse, meat cold store and wharf, on the foreshore adjacent to Admiralty House.The seven-storey building was destroyed by fire in December 1921, along with 30,000 bales of wool.  Its engine room, which survived the fire, supplied electricity to customers on the north side of the harbour, until around 1925.The land was sold off in 19 allotments, in 1925, and later redeveloped as blocks of apartments.

The Kirribilli area opened up further for development with the completion of the Sydney Harbour Bridge in 1932, which linked the municipality of North Sydney directly by road and rail with the CBD of the City of Sydney.

Population
In the 2016 Census, there were 3,820 people in Kirribilli. 52.0% of people were born in Australia. The most common other countries of birth were England 7.9% and New Zealand 3.5%. 72.0% of people only spoke English at home. The most common responses for religion were No Religion 37.4% and Catholic 21.4%.

Landmarks

Kirribilli is one of Australia's older suburbs, with the first land grants in the area being granted by the colonial government during the 1790s. A scattering of Georgian and Gothic-revival houses and mansions were built in the 1830s, '40s and '50s. Most of these have since been razed. Originally, Kirribilli formed part of the Parish of St Leonard's and was served by a private ferry service. In a process which began in the 1860s, the area's old estates were subdivided. New residential streets were laid out and terrace houses, Victorian villas and, later, blocks of apartments erected. During the early decades of the 20th century, Kirribilli's shoreline was dominated by a large, multi-storey brick warehouse which was eventually torn down to make way for housing.

The suburb contains Kirribilli House (the official Sydney residence of the Prime Minister of Australia), Admiralty House (the official Sydney residence of the Governor-General of Australia), and the headquarters and marina of the Royal Sydney Yacht Squadron located on the former Carabella mansion. The Sydney headquarters of ASIO was formerly at 31 Carabella Street. The Sydney Flying Squadron is located adjoining Milson Park, formerly Kirribilli Park.

Admiralty House, originally a private dwelling belonging to Colonel John George Nathaniel Gibbes, is Kirribilli's oldest extant building, the earliest portions of which date to 1842. Kirribilli House was built next door by Adolphus Frederick Feez, a wealthy merchant, in 1854–55.

The following buildings are on the Register of the National Estate:
 St Aloysius' College, Upper Pitt Street
 St Aloysius' College's junior school (formerly Kirribilli Public School), Burton Street
 Loreto Convent (formerly Elamang), Carabella Street
 Kirribilli Neighbourhood Centre, Fitzroy Street
 Sunnyside (house and grounds), Holbrook Avenue
 Kirribilli House, Kirribilli Avenue
 Admiralty House and Lodge, Kirribilli Point

Transport

Kirribilli supports the northern end of the Sydney Harbour Bridge. The Warringah Freeway provides a link south to the Sydney CBD and north to Chatswood. Kirribilli is serviced by rail, bus and ferry services.

Milsons Point railway station is the closest railway station on the North Shore railway line of the Sydney Trains network. It is located next to the main shopping streets, and has frequent services to the Sydney CBD and the North Shore.

Busways operate regular services from Kirribilli to many parts of northern Sydney. The 269 bus service runs a loop within the Kirribilli - Milsons Point - McMahons Point - North Sydney railway station area on weekdays.

There are four operating ferry wharves near Kirribilli, serviced by both public and private ferries. They are:

 On the eastern side is Kirribilli wharf, part of the Sydney Ferries Neutral Bay service. The wharf is one stop from Circular Quay and has two services per hour in each direction. Kirribilli Wharf also has a small local cafe serving coffees, cakes, and newspapers to commuters and many local regulars.
 At the southernmost tip of Kirribilli is the Beulah Street Wharf. This small wharf was dropped from public Sydney Ferries services when an inner harbour ferry route was cancelled, though was briefly pressed into service between 7–13 February 2011 and again on 27–28 October 2012 while the main Kirribilli wharf was undergoing maintenance. In 2005, private operator Matilda Cruises started using Beulah Street Wharf as part of their Matilda Express loop from Circular Quay to Darling Harbour but it was suspended by 2006. Outside ferry hours, Beulah Street Wharf is frequently used for fishing and recreation and being directly north of the Sydney Opera House, offers spectacular harbour views.
 On the eastern side of the Sydney Harbour Bridge, Jeffreys Street Wharf is also no longer used by Sydney Ferries, with just a few services by Matilda Cruises. It is still used by private charter services, but is more popular as a fishing location. The panoramic views of the Opera House, Circular Quay, and the Harbour Bridge make Jeffrey Street a popular location for wedding photography. 
 On the western side of the Bridge is Milsons Point ferry wharf, which carries many more services than the Kirribilli wharves and joins Kirribilli to the CBD, the inner harbour, and along the Parramatta River to Parramatta.

Commercial area

Kirribilli has a small shopping strip opposite Milsons Point railway station. The 'Kirribilli Markets' are held on the fourth Saturday of each month, on the lawns of the former Kirribilli Bowling Club. The markets contain a mixture of new and second-hand clothing, bric-a-brac, jewellery, and food-and-drink stands.

Schools
The two main schools in the suburb are St Aloysius' College and Loreto Kirribilli.

Churches
 Our Lady Star of the Sea Catholic Church, part of North Sydney Parish
 St John's Anglican Church ("Church by the Bridge")

Culture
Kirribilli is the home of Australia's oldest continuously operating professional theatre company, The Ensemble Theatre.  Located in a converted boatshed, it shows productions of contemporary works by both Australian and International playwrights.

People 
 Elizabeth von Arnim (1866-1941), German-British novelist

See also

Streets
 Beulah Street, Bligh Street, Bradley Avenue, Broughton Street, Burton Street, Carabella Street, Clark Road, Crescent Place, Elamang Avenue, Ennis Road, Fitzroy Street, Hipwood Street, Holbrook Avenue, Humphrey Place, Jeffrey(s) Street, Kirribilli Avenue, McBurney Lane, McDougall Street, Olympic Drive, Parkes Street, Peel Street, Pitt Street, Robertson Lane, Upper Pitt Street, Waruda Street, Willoughby Street, Winslow Lane, Winslow Street

Landmark buildings, structures and heritage
 Kirribilli House
 Admiralty House
 Sydney Harbour Bridge
 Reserve Bank of Australia
 Kirribilli Neighbourhood Centre
 Jeffrey(s) Street
 Church by the Bridge
 Huntingdon ('the Don'), Holbrook Avenue

Tourism, theatres and sport
 Luna Park Sydney
 Royal Sydney Yacht Squadron
 Ensemble Theatre
 Sydney Flying Squadron
 The Miguel Pro Playhouse

Transport
 Milsons Point railway station
 Milsons Point ferry wharf
 Kirribilli ferry wharf

Schools
 Loreto Kirribilli
 St Aloysius' College (Sydney)

Suburbs and localities
 Lavender Bay
 North Sydney
 Milsons Point
 Milson Park
 Careening Cove

Other
 Kirribilli agreement
 Garfish Restaurants

References

External links

  [CC-By-SA]
 Kirribilli Markets
  Kirribilli Wharf ferry services
  
 Parliamentary discussion of the condition of Kirribilli wharves

Suburbs of Sydney